John 'Jack' Francis Short (born 12 April 1951) is a former Irish first-class cricketer and civil servant.

Short was born at Cork in April 1951, where he was educated at Presentation Brothers College. After completing his secondary education, he studied mathematics and statistics at University College Cork. He graduated in 1974 and took up a post in the Irish civil service.

Playing his club cricket for Cork County, Short made his debut in first-class cricket for Ireland against Scotland at Alloway in 1974. He played in Ireland's first ever List A match in 1980, when Ireland played Middlesex in the Gillette Cup. He played first-class and List A cricket for Ireland until 1980, making eleven appearances in first-class cricket and five in List A cricket. In first-class cricket as an opening batsman, he scored 533 runs at a batting average of 33.31, with a high score of 114. This score, which was his only first-class century, came against Scotland in 1975. In List A cricket, he scored 97 runs with a high score of 37.

His playing career for Ireland came to an end in 1984, when he accepted a position with the OECD in Paris. He played club cricket in Paris for Standard Athletic Club, as well as representing France in minor matches against the Marylebone Cricket Club and Belgium.

References

External links

1951 births
Living people
Sportspeople from Cork (city)
People educated at Presentation Brothers College, Cork
Alumni of University College Cork
Irish cricketers
Irish civil servants
OECD officials
Irish expatriates in France
French cricketers